William Howson (born 1892) was an English professional footballer who played as an inside left.

Career
Born in Garforth, Howson played for Castleford Town, Bradford City and Oldham Athletic. For Bradford City, he made 58 appearances in the Football League; he also made 6 FA Cup appearances.

Sources

References

1892 births
Year of death missing
English footballers
Castleford Town F.C. players
Bradford City A.F.C. players
Oldham Athletic A.F.C. players
English Football League players
Association football inside forwards